Bhodra river (Bengali: ভদ্রা নদী) flows across the Khulna Division of Bangladesh.

Location
The river is originated from Kopotaksha River in Jessore and fall on the connecting point of Shibsha and Poshur river.

References

Further reading
 
 

Rivers of Bangladesh
Khulna Division
Rivers of Khulna Division